An annular solar eclipse will occur on Tuesday, October 24, 2079. A solar eclipse occurs when the Moon passes between Earth and the Sun, thereby totally or partly obscuring the image of the Sun for a viewer on Earth. An annular solar eclipse occurs when the Moon's apparent diameter is smaller than the Sun's, blocking most of the Sun's light and causing the Sun to look like an annulus (ring). An annular eclipse appears as a partial eclipse over a region of the Earth thousands of kilometres wide.

Related eclipses

Solar eclipses 2076–2079

Tritos series

Metonic series

References

External links 

2079 10 24
2079 in science
2079 10 24
2079 10 24